William Fraser Dunn  (2 February 18777 October 1951) was a Labor Party politician and member of the New South Wales Legislative Assembly from 1910 until 1950. He served as Minister for Agriculture for eight years, as well as deputy leader and leader of the Labor Party in New South Wales.

Early life
Dunn was born in Queanbeyan where his father was a small farm holder. He was educated at the local public school which he left at the age of 15 to assist on his father's farm. Following an injury he joined the New South Wales Department of Education and taught at various schools in NSW regional areas.

Political career
He joined the ALP in 1895 and was the party's successful candidate for the seat of Mudgee in the 1910 election. He resigned from the Labor Party and parliament in protest at the party's land policy in 1911. This left the party without a majority in the parliament and the policy was rapidly changed, allowing Dunn to win the resulting by-election as the endorsed ALP candidate. He continued as the member for Mudgee until the seat was replaced by the multi-member seat of Wammerawa in 1920. He represented this electorate until the single member seat of Mudgee was recreated in 1927 and, with the exception of the period 1932–1935, he remained the member for Mudgee until his retirement in 1950. In 1915-1918 he was granted leave from parliament to serve as a captain in the First Australian Imperial Force.

Ministerial career
Dunn was the  Minister for Agriculture in the governments of John Storey, James Dooley, Jack Lang, William McKell and the first ministry of James McGirr. Under his leadership the ministry expanded its activities in organised marketing and co-operative development.

Party Leader
Although Dunn had no factional power base in the Labor Party, his geniality resulted in his advancement within the parliamentary caucus. He was the deputy leader of the party in 1922–1923 and was selected by the federal executive of the ALP as a stopgap parliamentary leader during a factional party schism related to the expulsion of James Dooley from the party. Jack Lang claimed that Dunn spent much of his time as party leader wandering around parliament house, trying to get Labor party members to attend a caucus meeting.

References

 

|-

|-

1877 births
1951 deaths
Members of the New South Wales Legislative Assembly
Leaders of the Opposition in New South Wales
Australian Labor Party members of the Parliament of New South Wales
Australian military personnel of World War I
Australian Army soldiers
Burials at Eastern Suburbs Memorial Park